Communications in Grenada

Telephone 

Country Code: +1473
International Call Prefix: 011 (outside NANP)

Calls from Grenada to the US, Canada, and other NANP Caribbean nations, are dialed as 1 + NANP area code + 7-digit number. Calls from Grenada to non-NANP countries are dialed as 011 + country code + phone number with local area code. 

The entire country uses the St. George's rate centre.

Number Format: nxx-xxxx

Telephones - main lines in use:
32,491 (2017)

Telephones - mobile cellular:
113,177 (2017)

Telephone system:
adequate, automatic, island-wide telephone system
domestic:
interisland VHF and UHF radiotelephone links
international:
new SHF radiotelephone links to Trinidad and Tobago and Saint Vincent; VHF and UHF radio links to Trinidad

Radio 

Radio broadcast stations:
AM 2, FM 13, shortwave 0 (1998), includes ZBF-AM (Klassic AM)

Radios:
57,000 (1997)

Television 

Television broadcast stations:
4 (2008)

Televisions:
33,000 (1997)

Internet 

Internet Service Providers (ISPs):
Two (2010) - LIME (Cable & Wireless - www.time4lime.com) and Flow (Columbus Communications - www.flowgrenada.com)

Internet subscriptions:
22,235 (2017)

Internet users:
62,123 (July 2016)

Country code (Top-level domain): GD

References
 Find Telecommunication expertise in Grenada profile - Commonwealth of Nations
 CIA World Fact Book

External links
 National Telecommunications Regulatory Commission for Grenada, Carriacou, and Petite-Martinique
 Eastern Caribbean Telecommunications Authority (ECTEL)
 Grenada, Carriacou, and Petite-Martinique, SubmarineCableMap.com

Grenada

Grenada